Priscilla is an English female given name adopted from Latin Prisca, derived from priscus. One suggestion is that it is intended to bestow long life on the bearer.

The name first appears in the New Testament either as Priscilla or Prisca, a female leader in early Christianity. The name also appears along with Maximilla, referring to two female leaders of the Montanist movement of the 2nd century AD. 

The name appears in English literature in Edmund Spenser's The Faerie Queene (1596), and was adopted as an English name by the Puritans in the 17th century. 

Notable people and characters with the name include:

People
 Priscilla, an early Christian of the New Testament and companion to Paul the Apostle
 Priscilla and Maximilla, charismatic prophets of the 2nd century Montanist movement
 Priscilla (Brazilian singer) (born 1990), Brazilian singer and songwriter
 Priscilla Ahn, American singer
 Priscilla Alden (c. 1602 – c. 1680), member of Massachusetts Bay Colony, wife of John Alden
 Priscilla Barnes (born 1954), American actress
 Priscilla Bertie, 21st Baroness Willoughby de Eresby (1761–1828), British noble
 Priscilla Betti (born 1989), French singer and actress
 Priscilla Block, American singer
 Priscilla Braislin (1838–1888), American mathematician
 Priscilla Chan (born 1985), American philanthropist, wife of Facebook CEO Mark Zuckerberg
 Priscilla Chan Wai-Han (born 1965), singer from Hong Kong
 Priscilla Dean (1896–1987), American actress
 Priscilla Diaz (MISSPSTAR/P-Star) (born 1994), American rapper, singer and actress
 Priscilla Garita (born 1968), American actress
 Priscilla Hill (born 1960), American retired figure skater
 Priscilla Horton (1818–1895), English singer and actress
 Priscilla Kemble (1756–1845), English actress
 Priscilla Lane (1915–1995), of the singing Lane Sisters
 Priscilla Leung (born 1961), Hong Kong legislator, barrister and associate professor
 Priscilla Lopes-Schliep (born 1982), Canadian track and field hurdler
 Priscilla Lopez (born 1948), American singer, dancer and actress
 Priscilla Maria Veronica White (1943–2015), known professionally as Cilla Black, British singer, television presenter, actress and author
 Priscilla Meirelles (born 1983), Brazilian model, host, actress, environmentalist, and beauty queen
 Priscilla Morgan (born 1934), British actress
 Priscilla Nzimiro (born 1923), physician from Nigeria
 Priscilla Owen (born 1954), United States federal judge for the Fifth Circuit
 Priscilla Pitts, New Zealand writer and art curator
 Priscilla Pointer (born 1924), American actress and mother of actress Amy Irving
 Priscilla Presley (born 1945), American actress and businesswoman and ex-wife of Elvis Presley
 Priscilla Shirer (born 1974), American author, motivational speaker, actress, Christian evangelist
 Priscilla J. Smith, American lawyer and activist
 Priscilla Taylor American model and actress
 Priscilla Cooper Tyler (1816–1889), acting First Lady of the United States, daughter-in-law of President John Tyler
 Priscilla Wakefield (1751–1832), English Quaker educational writer and philanthropist
 Priscilla Welch (born 1944), British marathon runner
 Priscilla Wong (born 1981), Hong Kong television actress and host
 Priscilla Young (1925–2006), English social worker
 Prisilla Rivera (born 1984), volleyball player from the Dominican Republic

Fictional characters
 The Adventures of Priscilla, Queen of the Desert, 1994 comedy-drama film
 Priscilla, Queen of the Desert (musical), musical of the 1994 film with the same name
 Priscilla: The Hidden Life of an Englishwoman in Wartime France, a 2013 book by Nicholas Shakespeare
 Priscilla "Pris" Stratton, a replicant character from the 1982 film Blade Runner
 Priscilla, character from the film 1981 miniseries Peter and Paul
 Priscilla, a sweet cactus mouse or aye-aye in the 2011 computer-animated action comedy film Rango
 Priscilla Mullins, a main character in the 1979 film Mayflower: The Pilgrims' Adventure
 Priscilla White, the main character in the 2009 comedy film American Virgin
 Priscilla, character in the 2008 martial arts film Chocolate
 Priscilla Stasna, a main character in the American sitcom The King of Queens
 Priscilla, character in the 1993 film Bank Robber
 Priscilla Kitaen, real name of Voodoo, a comic book character appearing in Wildstorm and DC Comics.
 Priscilla Lapham, a main character in the 1957 film Johnny Tremain
 Priscilla Pig, Bob Cratchit's father in the 2006 animated comedy film Bah, Humduck! A Looney Tunes Christmas 
 Constable Priscilla Smith 'Smithy', a main character in the 2010 Australian television police drama Cops L.A.C.
 Priscilla Maine, New York society member in the 1920 silent drama film The Dark Mirror
 Priscilla P, was a member of the " Happiness Patrol on Terra Alpha" in the second serial of the television series Doctor Who
 Priscilla, a character in Nathaniel Hawthorne's 1852 novel The Blithedale Romance
 Priscilla, an antagonist in Norihiro Yagi's dark fantasy manga, Claymore
 Priscilla, a romantic poet and bard in an action fantasy role-playing video game The Witcher 3: Wild Hunt.
 Crossbreed Priscilla, a character in an action fantasy role-playing video game Dark Souls.
 Priscilla, a Simon Kidgits character developed by Simon Brand Ventures
 Priscilla Barielle, a character from the light novel/anime series Re:Zero − Starting Life in Another World·

Prisca 
 Prisca (empress) (d. 315), Roman empress, wife of Diocletian and mother of Galeria Valeria
 Prisca (Prophet) (late 2nd century), founding leader and prophet of Montanism
 Saint Prisca (late 1st century), Roman Catholic martyr and saint

See also
 List of biblical names

References

English feminine given names